Deluşorul Mânzului is a Romanian hill, a natural landmark in Slănic (Prahova), whose name ("the colt's small hill") comes from the fact that it is covered with the plant horsetail (Equisetum arvense).

Deluşorul Mânzului lies to the north-east of Slănic, forty-five minutes from the town centre on the hiking trail to Dealul cu semn (Beacon Hill). The altitude difference between the bed of Slănic creek and the top of Deluşorul Mânzului is approximately 150 metres (450 ft).

Hills of Romania